Sam Choy Sr. is an American chef, restaurateur, and television personality known as a founding contributor of Pacific Rim cuisine.

Biography 
Choy is the son of a Chinese father, Hung Sam Choy, and a German–Hawaiian mother, Clairemoana. He grew up in Laie, Oahu. Choy is an alumnus of the Kapiolani Community College's Culinary Arts program.

One of his first jobs as a chef was at The Waldorf-Astoria Hotel in New York City. He would then return to Hawaii, where he eventually opened a chain of restaurants. Choy helped develop and popularize Hawaii regional cuisine. In 1991, Choy founded the Poke Festival and Recipe Contest.

In 2004, Choy was awarded the James Beard Foundation's America's Classics Award for Sam Choy's Kaloko in Kailua-Kona, on the Big Island of Hawaii. The award recognizes "beloved regional restaurants" that reflect the character of their communities.

Choy has appeared in several Food Network programs, including Ready.. Set... Cook!, Chopped’s first Grill Master Tournament, and Iron Chef America.

He is good friends with Emeril Lagasse, who has appeared on Choy's TV show Sam Choy's Kitchen on KHNL. Lagasse has also mentioned Choy by name several times in his television shows; one of those times he was making Poke on his live TV show, and added peanut butter to the Poke- Choy's "secret ingredient". In 2015, Choy broadcast a series on YouTube, Sam Choy In The Kitchen.

Choy has designed Hawaiian-inspired dishes for American Airlines’ first class passengers to and from Hawaii.

Personal life
He is married to Carol, with whom he has two sons, Sam Jr. and Christopher.

Choy lives in Kona District, Hawaii.

Publications
 Sam Choy (1995). "With Sam Choy: Cooking from the Heart"
 Sam Choy (1999). "The Choy of Seafood"
 Sam Choy, U'I Goldsberry, & Steven Goldsberry (1999). "Sam Choy's Island Flavors"
 Sam Choy and Catherine Enomoto (2000). "Sam Choy's Cooking: Island Cuisine at Its Best"
 Sam Choy (2001). "Sam Choy Woks the Wok: Stir Fry Cooking at Its Island Best"
 Sam Choy (2001). "Sam Choy's Cooking with Kids"
 Sam Choy (2000). "Sam Choy's Sampler: Hawaii's Favorite Recipes"
 Sam Choy (2002). "Sam Choy's Polynesian Kitchen: More Than 150 Authentic Dishes from One of the World's Most Delicious and Overlooked Cuisine"
 Sam Choy (2002). "Sam Choy's visits Mr. Burkott and his farm in Hawaii"
 Sam Choy (2003). "Sam Choy's Little Hawaiian Cookbook for Big Appetites"
 Sam Choy, Lynn Cook, and Douglas Peebles (2003). "A Hawaiian Luau with Sam Choy and The Makaha Sons"
 Sam Choy and Elizabeth Meahl. (2004). "Sam Choy's A Little Hawaiian Poke Cookbook"
 Sam Choy (2006). "Aloha Cuisine"
 Sam Choy (2009). "Poke"

Restaurants
 Created Huki Lau Cafe (no longer owned by Choy, Laie, O'ahu, Hawaii)
 Sam Choy's Breakfast, Lunch, and Crab (Closed in 2013)
 Sam Choy's (Tumon Bay, Guam)
 Sam Choy's Kai Lanai ( Big Island, Hawaii)
 Sam Choy's Seafood Style Island Grille (Pearl Harbor, O'ahu, Hawaii)
 Sam Choy's Kahului (Queen Kaahumanu Center, Kahului, Maui - Closed)
 Sam Choy's Lahaina (Front Street - Closed)
 Sam Choy's Poke to the Max (Seattle & Tacoma, Washington)
 Pier Nine by Sam Choy (HPU Campus, O'ahu, Hawaii)
 Holoholo Grill (Kauai at Koloa Landing Hotel)
 Sam Choy’s Ohana Diner (Bowl Incline, Incline Village, Nevada)
 Sam Choy's Kaloko (Kaloko, Hawaii - Closed)

See also
 Cuisine of Hawaii
 Iron Chef America
 George Mavrothalassitis
 Poke (Hawaii)
 Alan Wong
 Roy Yamaguchi

References

External links

 Food Network biography 

American television chefs
American male chefs
American food writers
Living people
Year of birth missing (living people)
Place of birth missing (living people)
American people of Chinese descent
American restaurateurs
Chefs from Hawaii
James Beard Foundation Award winners
20th-century American businesspeople
Waldorf Astoria New York
Food Network chefs
American YouTubers
People from Hawaii (island)
American Airlines people